Tony Gwynn is a bronze sculpture by William Behrends depicting the professional baseball player of the same name, installed outside San Diego's Petco Park, in the U.S. state of California.

Description
The bronze statue is 9.5 feet tall. An inscription on the front of the statue's base reads, "Tony Gwynn, Mr. Padre". The reverse side of the base has an inscription by Gwynn's father: "If you work hard, good things will happen."

History
The sculpture was installed in 2007.

Fans gathered at the sculpture to pay tribute to Gwynn, following his death in 2014.

See also
 2007 in art

References

2007 establishments in California
2007 sculptures
Bronze sculptures in California
Cultural depictions of American men
Cultural depictions of baseball players
Monuments and memorials in California
Outdoor sculptures in San Diego
Sculptures of African Americans
Sculptures of men in California
Statues in San Diego
Statues of sportspeople